Madathupatti is a small village near Sivakasi in Virudhunagar District, Tamil Nadu, India.

Villages in Virudhunagar district